Gregory Scott "Woody" Williams (born August 19, 1966) is an American baseball coach and former pitcher, who is the current pitching coach for the Texas Longhorns. He played in Major League Baseball (MLB) for the Toronto Blue Jays, San Diego Padres, St. Louis Cardinals, and Houston Astros.

Baseball career
On December 12, 1998, he was traded to the San Diego Padres with minor leaguer Peter Tucci and Carlos Almanzar for right-handed pitcher Joey Hamilton. He worked exclusively as a starter in San Diego. In 2001, he began the season with an 8–8 win–loss record with a 4.97 ERA in 23 starts. 

On August 2, 2001, he was traded to the St. Louis Cardinals for outfielder Ray Lankford, whereupon he went 7–1 with a 2.28 ERA in 11 starts.

On August 10, 2003, Williams became the first big-league pitcher to hit into an unassisted triple play, in which Atlanta Braves shortstop Rafael Furcal became the 12th major-leaguer to make one of the rarest plays in baseball.  He continued to pitch well for St. Louis, making the 2003 All-Star Game and starting Game 1 of the 2004 World Series.

After the  season ended, Williams filed for free agency; he signed back with the Padres on December 9, 2004.

On November 24, 2006, the Houston Astros announced they had signed Williams to a two-year, $12.5 million contract, at the same press conference announcing the Carlos Lee signing.

After a career-worst 2007 season with Houston, where he went 8–15 with a 5.27 ERA, and a poor showing during the  spring training, Williams was released by the Astros on March 29 and subsequently retired.

As a hitter, Williams was better than average for a pitcher, posting a .194 batting average (105-for-540) with four home runs and 43 runs batted in.

Williams is one of only 18 pitchers to earn a victory against all 30 MLB teams.

Pitching style
Williams' best pitch was a cut fastball that he could throw from 89 to 92 mph. He relied on his curveball as his strikeout pitch, used a straight changeup as well, and threw an occasional knuckleball.

Personal life

He lives in Houston with his wife and five children: Katelyn, Sarah, Hannah, Caden, and Lillian.  His cousin Chase Ortiz was a defensive end for the Winnipeg Blue Bombers of the Canadian Football League. Williams began coaching varsity baseball at Fort Bend Baptist Academy in 2009, and led the team to the Texas Class 4A semifinals in 2010 and 2011.

References

External links

Pelota Binaria (Venezuelan Winter League)

1966 births
Living people
American expatriate baseball players in Canada
Baseball players from Houston
Cardenales de Lara players
American expatriate baseball players in Venezuela
Dunedin Blue Jays players
Houston Astros players
Houston Cougars baseball players
Knoxville Blue Jays players
Lake Elsinore Storm players
Las Vegas Stars (baseball) players
Major League Baseball pitchers
Memphis Redbirds players
National League All-Stars
People from Alvin, Texas
Portland Beavers players
Rancho Cucamonga Quakes players
San Diego Padres players
San Jacinto Gators baseball coaches
St. Catharines Blue Jays players
St. Catharines Stompers players
St. Louis Cardinals players
Syracuse Chiefs players
Texas Longhorns baseball coaches
Toronto Blue Jays players